Clinton Panther (born 13 February 1991, Port Elizabeth) is a South African field hockey player. At the 2012 Summer Olympics he competed with the national team in the men's tournament.  He also represented South Africa at the 2014 and 2018 Commonwealth Games.

Personal life
His brother, Brandon, has also represented South Africa internationally in hockey.  He studied finance at the University of Johannesburg and won Gauteng Sportsman of the Year in 2014. 

He is Investment Specialist at Coronation Fund Managers.

References

External links

1991 births
Living people
Field hockey players at the 2012 Summer Olympics
Olympic field hockey players of South Africa
South African male field hockey players
People from Port Elizabeth
Field hockey players at the 2014 Commonwealth Games
Field hockey players at the 2018 Commonwealth Games
Commonwealth Games competitors for South Africa
University of Johannesburg alumni
2014 Men's Hockey World Cup players